Yea Toh Two Much Ho Gaya is a 2016 Indian comedy action drama movie directed by Anwer Khan.
It features  Jimmy Sheirgill, Arbaaz Khan, Bruna Abdullah and Pooja Chopra in lead roles. The film was released on 2 September 2016.

Plot
The movie starts in Thailand in a restaurant when Mann is in a party with his girlfriend. Where Rickey, a lazy boy who is the brother of a gangster, tries to take a selfie with her and is stopped by Jimmy Shergill. When they try to leave then the boy attacks them but is badly beaten and then hospitalized. In other part the gangster Arbaaz Khan kills his rival gangster and then he learns that his brother is hospitalised. He visits his brother in hospital and swears revenge. He has a twin brother Mohan who lives with his mother in a Village. He loves a girl but her cousin brother opposes the marriage. Then both brothers find them in a situation where Mohan went to Thailand and Mann returns to the village. The girlfriend of Mann is kidnapped by gangster in Thailand and here in a village a pregnant lady levels allegations against Mohan. Mann clears his brother's name in front of the Village Panchayat. Whereas Mohan rescues Mann's girlfriend from a gangster after thrashing him and his henchmen and returns to village. Then the marriage of Mann and Mohan is performed.

Cast
Jimmy Sheirgill as Mann/Mohan
Pooja Chopra as Meena
Bruna Abdullah as Tina
Arbaaz Khan as Mak
Murli Sharma as Rajveer Chaudhry
Zarina Wahab as Mann's Mother
Maushumi Udeshi as Sapna
Dev Sharma as Ricky
Vijay Patkar

Soundtrack
The soundtrack of the film is composed by Avishek Majumdar, with lyrics written by Anwer Khan, Jairaj Selvan, & Vishal V. Patil.

Track listing

Super Flop

References

2010s Hindi-language films